Minthis is a resort close to Tsada village in the south west district of Paphos, Cyprus.

Concept

Minthis is a resort development in Cyprus, situated within the wine-producing region of Paphos. The resort includes residences, villas and suites.

Climate 

Located at 505 metres above sea level, the resort climate is strictly Mediterranean as opposed to the town of Paphos which is Subtropical Mediterranean.

Stavros Tis Minthis Monastery 

“Stavros tis Minthis”, a twelfth-century monastery, from which the resort derived its name, is located within the grounds and is soon to undergo extensive restoration.  Inhabited by a single monk, the stone built monastery is an excellent example of architecture of the Byzantine era.  The chapel got its name when invaders forcibly took the monastery and set it alight but one of the monks had the foresight to take the sacred cross and hide it under some mint bushes in the immediate vicinity thereby ensuring its safety.  In the aftermath of the fight, the cross was found and the renaming of the remainder of the monastery and chapel was therefore under the name "Stavros Tis Minthis" which means "Cross of Mint".  Stavros Tis Minthis monastery falls under the Metropolis Of Pafos which belongs to the Admin and Holy Synod which forms part of the Church of Cyprus.

Environmental issues 

A man made reservoir to collect the naturally higher rainfall of the district has been operational within the resort since 2007.  The reservoir can contain 130,000 cubic metres of water and a grey water collection system recently installed and feeding back into the reservoir means that no water goes to waste.  Plans to enlarge the reservoir are already in the final stages. A programme to reinforce the local flora has been underway for 2 years by seed scattering and replanting of mature trees and shrubs.

Golf 

The 18 hole championship golf course was originally designed by Donald Steel in 1994 and recently renovated by Mackenzie & Ebert.  The new 13th hole has been transformed into a moat style island green.  This signature hole is without bunkers or fairway, just 150 metres from the elevated white tee to the green.  The course features two lakes and 35 bunkers.  
The golf course also includes a clubhouse which is due to open to the public in September 2011, an elevated 16 bay driving range, putting, chipping and pitching greens.  Work has already begun on an extension to the golf course and a junior academy is planned.

European Walking Route E4 

The European long-distance paths are found throughout Europe and the European Route E4 traverses through Europe encompassing Spain, France, Germany, Switzerland, Austria, Hungary, Bulgaria and Greece. The new section of the E4 which is located in Cyprus was inaugurated in 2005.  It starts at Larnaca and passes through the Troodos mountain range, Paphos and the Akamas peninsula and is 539 km long.  Nature trails have already been defined in Minthis Hills and will enhance the already popular European walking route E4 which runs through the heart of the resort.

References 

Resorts in Cyprus
Christian monasteries established in the 12th century
Golf clubs and courses in Cyprus